Undibacterium aquatile is a Gram-negative, strictly aerobic, rod-shaped and motile  bacterium from the genus of Undibacterium which has been isolated from the waterfall of the Gyeryongsan mountain in Korea.

References

Burkholderiales
Bacteria described in 2015